The House of Commons (Removal of Clergy Disqualification) Act 2001 (c.13) is an Act of the Parliament of the United Kingdom. The purpose of the Act was to remove the disqualifications for clergy in standing for election as Members of Parliament and sitting in the House of Commons. The Act also allowed clergy to sit in other elected bodies including the European Parliament. Some bishops of the Church of England continue to be disqualified, as they sit in the House of Lords as Lords Spiritual.

Previously clergy were disqualified to sit in the House of Commons due to the House of Commons (Clergy Disqualification) Act 1801 and section 10 of the House of Commons Disqualification Act 1975.

The Bill was a reaction to the selection of David Cairns, a laicised Catholic priest, as the Labour candidate for the safe seat of Greenock and Inverclyde. Member of Parliament Siobhain McDonagh had previously introduced similar legislation in 1999, but it had run out of parliamentary time.

See also
James Godfrey MacManaway

External links
 
 Explanatory note to the Act

United Kingdom Acts of Parliament 2001
History of Christianity in the United Kingdom
Acts of the Parliament of the United Kingdom concerning the House of Commons
Christianity and law in the 21st century
Law about religion in the United Kingdom
2001 in Christianity
Christianity and society in the United Kingdom